Kenneth Anderson (born October 9, 1970) is an American former professional basketball player. After a college career at Georgia Tech, he played point guard professionally from 1991 to 2006, mostly in the National Basketball Association.

Early life
Anderson was born in Queens, New York City. As a 16-year-old high school sophomore, the LeFrak City, Queens native who attended academic and athletic powerhouse Archbishop Molloy High School in Briarwood, Queens, was considered one of the best basketball prospects in America. Collegiate recruiters began scouting Anderson in sixth grade and he was on the front page of the New York City sports section when he was 14.

By the end of his high school career, he was a four-time Parade All-American, a feat not accomplished since Lew Alcindor, and the first player to be named All-City four times. He was a McDonald's All-American, was named New York State Mr. Basketball by the New York State Coaches Organization, and named High School Basketball Player of the Year by Gatorade, the New York State Sportswriters Association, Parade, Naismith, and USA Today Despite his coach, Jack Curran, benching him for the first quarter of all of his games during his freshman year at Molloy, Anderson set the all-time state record for scoring in New York, with 2,621 points. This record stood until 2004, when Lincoln High School guard Sebastian Telfair eclipsed the mark late in his senior season. He was considered the No. 1 player in the country, over such notables as Jimmy Jackson and Shaquille O'Neal.

College career
After a long recruiting process, Anderson signed a letter of intent in November 1988 to play at Georgia Tech, selecting the Yellow Jackets over North Carolina, Duke, and Syracuse.

Anderson played two years for Georgia Tech as the team's starting point guard, helping lead the team to the Final Four in 1990, along with swingmen Dennis Scott and Brian Oliver. The trio was nicknamed "Lethal Weapon 3". Despite winning the ACC title, they entered the NCAA tourney as only the fourth seed. They proceeded to sweep through the LSU Tigers, led by Shaquille O'Neal, and two Big 10 teams on their way to the Final Four. Georgia Tech's tournament run ended against eventual champions UNLV in the Final Four.

With Scott and Oliver gone after that season, Anderson averaged nearly 26 points per game. Georgia Tech secured a No. 8 seed for the 1991 NCAA tournament, where they lost in the second round to Ohio State. Soon after, Anderson announced that he would forgo his last two years of eligibility to enter the NBA draft.

College statistics

|-
| align="left" | 1989–90
| align="left" | Georgia Tech
| 35 || 35 || 37.7 || .515 || .410 || .733 || 5.5 || 8.1 || 2.3 || 0.1 || 20.6
|-
| align="left" | 1990–91
| align="left" | Georgia Tech
| 30 || 29 || 38.9 || .437 || .351 || .829 || 5.7 || 5.6 || 3.0 || 0.1 || 25.9
|- class="sortbottom"
| style="text-align:center;" colspan="2"| Career
| 65 || 64 || 38.3 || .473 || .374 || .787 || 5.6 || 7.0 || 2.6 || 0.1 || 23.0
|}

Professional career
Anderson was selected by the New Jersey Nets with the second pick in the 1991 NBA draft. He was the youngest player in the league in his rookie year, and averaged seven points, two rebounds, and 3.2 assists per game. During Anderson's second season he nearly doubled his point, rebound, and assist averages en route to the Nets making the 1992 NBA playoffs. While in New Jersey, coached by Chuck Daly, Anderson formed what was widely expected to become a "big three" of sorts with Derrick Coleman and Drazen Petrovic. However, Petrovic’s 1993 death in a car accident prevented this from coming to fruition. In his third season, he averaged career-highs of 18.8 points and 9.6 assists per game. That season, on February 18, 1994, Anderson scored a career-high 42 points and recorded 14 assists during a 119-114 win over the Detroit Pistons. That same season, Anderson and teammate Coleman represented the East squad in the 1994 NBA All-Star Game. He was traded to the Charlotte Hornets in 1996, along with Gerald Glass, in a deal for Khalid Reeves and Kendall Gill.

In 1996 Anderson signed with the Portland Trail Blazers. During the 1997 NBA Playoffs, Anderson averaged 17 points, 4.8 assists, and 4.3 rebounds per game during Portland’s first round loss to the Los Angeles Lakers. In 1998, the Trail Blazers traded Anderson, along with Alvin Williams, Gary Trent, and two 1998 first-round picks to the Toronto Raptors for Damon Stoudamire, Carlos Rogers, Walt Williams, and a 1998 second-round pick, but he refused to report to the team because he did not want to play in Canada, which prompted the Raptors to trade him to the Boston Celtics, along with Žan Tabak and Popeye Jones for John Thomas, Chauncey Billups, and Dee Brown. Anderson spent a considerable amount of time as a Celtic before he was sent to the Seattle SuperSonics, along with Vitaly Potapenko and Joseph Forte, and in a package for Vin Baker and Shammond Williams. At the 2003 NBA trade deadline, Anderson was dealt back to the Hornets, who had since relocated to New Orleans, for Elden Campbell. He then played as a reserve point guard for the Indiana Pacers, Atlanta Hawks, and Los Angeles Clippers.

Anderson was released from Lithuania's Žalgiris Kaunas after the 2005–06 season, thus ending his professional career as a basketball player.

National team career
Anderson played for the U.S. national team in the 1990 FIBA World Championship, where they won the bronze medal.

Personal life
Anderson was raised by his mother, Joan, and did not meet his father until he was in his thirties. He has two sisters, Sandra and Danielle. He was poor growing up, but Anderson says that being able to provide for his mother was inspiration for him to become a professional basketball player. In October 2005, his mother died from a heart attack.

Anderson is the father of seven children, by four women. He became a father of a daughter while attending Georgia Tech.  He had a relationship with Dee Dee Roper (DJ Spinderella of the rap group Salt-n-Pepa), and they have a daughter together. He was married to Tami Roman (who has appeared on the reality series Basketball Wives), but they divorced. They have two daughters, including hip-hop artist Jazz Anderson. Anderson met his second wife Tamiyka R Lockhart in West Los Angeles in 1998 while they both were going through divorces. They have a son together, Kenneth Anderson Jr. They divorced in 2004. He met his third wife, Natasha, during the 2004 NBA playoffs. They married in 2007. Anderson and Natasha are raising his son Kenny Jr. and her daughter.

In 2005, despite earning $63 million during his NBA career, Anderson filed for bankruptcy.

In 2013, Anderson reported that he was sexually abused as a child by both a person who lived in his neighborhood and a basketball coach.

In February 2019, Anderson was hospitalized for several days near his home of Pembroke Pines, Florida after suffering a stroke.

After the NBA
In 2007, Anderson was named as the coach of the Continental Basketball Association's Atlanta Krunk. The team was owned by Freedom Williams of C+C Music Factory.

In 2008, Anderson made a TV appearance on Pros vs Joes.

In September 2008, he was inducted into the New York City Basketball Hall of Fame.

In 2008, he became the head coach of slamball team Hombres, and helped them to a semi-finals berth.

Anderson graduated in 2010 from St. Thomas University in Miami, with a degree in organizational leadership.

In August 2011, Anderson took the position of basketball coach at the David Posnack Jewish Day School in Davie, Florida. In May 2013, following a DUI arrest, the school indicated that they would not renew his contract.

In 2014, Anderson was named to a team assembled by Dennis Rodman as part of his "basketball diplomacy" effort in North Korea with the job of playing an exhibition match against the North Korean Senior National Team to celebrate the birthday of Kim Jong-un.

In 2015, Anderson appeared in Dwayne Johnson's reality TV show Wake Up Call.

In 2017, Anderson appeared in Mr. Chibbs, directed by Jill Campbell. This documentary tracked Anderson's life post basketball as he came to terms with personal demons in his life.

In 2018, Anderson was hired as the head basketball coach for Fisk University.

NBA career statistics

Regular season

|-
| style="text-align:left;"| 
| style="text-align:left;"|New Jersey
| 64 || 13 || 17.0 || .390 || .231 || .745 || 2.0 || 3.2 || 1.0 || 0.1 || 7.0
|-
| style="text-align:left;"| 
| style="text-align:left;"|New Jersey
| 55 || 55 || 36.5 || .435 || .280 || .776 || 4.1 || 8.2 || 1.7 || 0.2 || 16.9
|-
| style="text-align:left;"| 
| style="text-align:left;"|New Jersey
| 82 || 82 || 38.2 || .417 || .303 || .818 || 3.9 || 9.6 || 1.9 || 0.2 || 18.8
|-
| style="text-align:left;"| 
| style="text-align:left;"|New Jersey
| 72 || 70 || 37.3 || .399 || .330 || .841 || 3.5 || 9.4 || 1.4 || 0.2 || 17.6
|-
| style="text-align:left;"| 
| style="text-align:left;"|New Jersey
| 31 || 28 || 33.6 || .376 || .364 || .803 || 3.3 || 8.0 || 1.7 || 0.3 || 15.3
|-
| style="text-align:left;"| 
| style="text-align:left;"|Charlotte
| 38 || 36 || 34.3 || .454 || .357 || .727 || 2.7 || 8.6 || 1.6 || 0.2 || 15.2
|-
| style="text-align:left;"| 
| style="text-align:left;"|Portland
| 82 || 81 || 37.6 || .427 || .361 || .768 || 4.4 || 7.1 || 2.0 || 0.2 || 17.5
|-
| style="text-align:left;"| 
| style="text-align:left;"|Portland
| 45 || 40 || 32.7 || .387 || .353 || .772 || 3.0 || 5.4 || 1.4 || 0.0 || 12.6
|-
| style="text-align:left;"| 
| style="text-align:left;"|Boston
| 16 || 16 || 24.1 || .435 || .370 || .837 || 2.4 || 6.3 || 1.6 || 0.0 || 11.2
|-
| style="text-align:left;"| 
| style="text-align:left;"|Boston
| 34 || 33 || 29.7 || .451 || .250 || .832 || 3.0 || 5.7 || 1.0 || 0.1 || 12.1
|-
| style="text-align:left;"| 
| style="text-align:left;"|Boston
| 82 || 82 || 31.6 || .440 || .386 || .775 || 2.7 || 5.1 || 1.7 || 0.1 || 14.0
|-
| style="text-align:left;"| 
| style="text-align:left;"|Boston
| 33 || 28 || 25.7 || .388 || .333 || .831 || 2.2 || 4.1 || 1.3 || 0.1 || 7.5
|-
| style="text-align:left;"| 
| style="text-align:left;"|Boston
| 76 || 76 || 32.0 || .436 || .273 || .742 || 3.6 || 5.3 || 1.9 || 0.1 || 9.6
|-
| style="text-align:left;"| 
| style="text-align:left;"|Seattle
| 38 || 1 || 18.1 || .440 || .000 || .829 || 2.3 || 3.2 || 1.1 || 0.0 || 6.1
|-
| style="text-align:left;"| 
| style="text-align:left;"|New Orleans
| 23 || 1 || 19.4 || .407 || .500 || .727 || 2.0 || 3.3 || 0.8 || 0.2 || 6.0
|-
| style="text-align:left;"| 
| style="text-align:left;"|Indiana
| 44 || 31 || 20.6 || .441 || .250 || .729 || 1.8 || 2.8 || 0.6 || 0.1 || 6.0
|-
| style="text-align:left;"| 
| style="text-align:left;"|Atlanta
| 39 || 20 || 18.4 || .426 || .462 || .730 || 2.1 || 2.5 || 0.8 || 0.0 || 5.0
|-
| style="text-align:left;"| 
| style="text-align:left;"|L.A. Clippers
| 4 || 0 || 6.5 || .364 || – || – || 1.3 || 1.3 || 0.0 || 0.0 || 2.0
|- class="sortbottom"
| style="text-align:center;" colspan="2"| Career
| 858 || 693 || 30.1 || .421 || .346 || .790 || 3.1 || 6.1 || 1.5 || 0.1 || 12.6
|- class="sortbottom"
| style="text-align:center;" colspan="2"| All-Star
| 1 || 1 || 16.0 || .300 || .000 || – || 4.0 || 3.0 || 0.0 || 0.0 || 6.0

Playoffs

|-
|style="text-align:left;"|1992
|style="text-align:left;"|New Jersey
|3||0||8.0||.333||–||1.000||1.0||1.0||0.3||0.0||2.7
|-
|style="text-align:left;"|1994
|style="text-align:left;"|New Jersey
|4||4||45.3||.352||.300||.667||3.0||6.8||2.3||0.0||15.8
|-
|style="text-align:left;"|1997
|style="text-align:left;"|Portland
|4||4||42.3||.478||.263||.950||4.3||4.8||1.8||0.3||17.0
|-
|style="text-align:left;"|2002
|style="text-align:left;"|Boston
|16||16||35.0||.416||–||.800||3.1||4.8||1.3||0.0||12.0
|-
|style="text-align:left;"|2003
|style="text-align:left;"|New Orleans
|5||0||10.2||.333||–||1.000||0.4||1.8||0.6||0.0||2.2
|-
|style="text-align:left;"|2004
|style="text-align:left;"|Indiana
|4||0||4.8||.286||–||–||0.3||0.3||0.3||0.0||1.0
|- class="sortbottom"
| style="text-align:center;" colspan="2"| Career
| 36 || 24 || 27.9 || .406 || .276 || .796 || 2.4 || 3.8 || 1.2 || 0.0 || 9.6

References

External links

 NBA.com biography

1970 births
Living people
20th-century African-American sportspeople
21st-century African-American sportspeople
1990 FIBA World Championship players
African-American basketball players
All-American college men's basketball players
American expatriate basketball people in Lithuania
American men's basketball players
Archbishop Molloy High School alumni
Atlanta Hawks players
Basketball coaches from New York (state)
Basketball players from New York City
BC Žalgiris players
Boston Celtics players
Charlotte Hornets players
College men's basketball head coaches in the United States
Competitors at the 1990 Goodwill Games
Continental Basketball Association coaches
Fisk Bulldogs men's basketball coaches
Georgia Tech Yellow Jackets men's basketball players
Goodwill Games medalists in basketball
High school basketball coaches in Florida
Indiana Pacers players
Los Angeles Clippers players
McDonald's High School All-Americans
National Basketball Association All-Stars
New Jersey Nets draft picks
New Jersey Nets players
New Orleans Hornets players
Parade High School All-Americans (boys' basketball)
Point guards
Portland Trail Blazers players
Seattle SuperSonics players
Sportspeople from Queens, New York
United States men's national basketball team players